For a list of crosses, see:

 Christian cross variants
 Crosses in heraldry
 List of tallest crosses